Samsung Galaxy A10e is an Android Smartphone manufactured by Samsung Electronics as a cheaper variant of the Samsung Galaxy A10. It was announced in July 2019 and released in August 2019. It comes with Android 9 (Pie) with Samsung's first version of One UI. It is the predecessor to the Samsung Galaxy A20e.

Specifications

Hardware 
The Samsung Galaxy A10e is equipped with a 5.83 inch PLS TFT capacitive touchscreen with a resolution of 720x1560 (~295 ppi). The phone itself measures 147.3 x 69.6 x 8.4 mm (5.80 x 2.74 x 0.33 in) and weighs 141 grams (5.0 oz). It is powered by Samsung's in-house Exynos 7884 SoC with an octa-core (2x1.6 GHz Cortex-A73 & 6x1.35 GHz Cortex-A53) CPU and a Mali-G71 MP2 GPU. It comes with 32GB of Internal storage which is expandable up to 512GB via MicroSD card slot and 2 GB or 3 GB RAM (depending on the model). The phone has a non-removable 3000mAh battery.

Software 
The Samsung Galaxy A10e comes with One UI 1.1 over Android 9 (Pie), upgradable to One UI 3.0 over Android 11.

See also 

 Samsung Galaxy A10
 Samsung Galaxy A01
Samsung Galaxy A11

References

Samsung Galaxy
Mobile phones introduced in 2019
Android (operating system) devices
Samsung mobile phones